Club Deportivo Broncos was a Honduran football club based in Choluteca, Honduras.

History
The club bought C.D. Verdún's franchise in 1972–73. Verdún itself had taken over the Atlético Español franchise in 1971.

Due to financial problems, the club sold its franchise to Universidad and became Broncos UNAH after the 1981–82 season and later just Universidad.  They closed operations after their relegation in 2001.

Achievements
Segunda División
Winners (1): 1993–94
Runners-up (1): 1968–69

Copa Fraternidad
Winners (1): 1980

League performance

 The 1972–73 season was canceled after 9 rounds.

References

Football clubs in Honduras
C.D. Broncos
UNCAF Interclub Cup winning clubs